Avenue Mohammed V is the name of thoroughfares in numerous cities in Morocco and elsewhere, honoring King Mohammed V of Morocco:

 Avenue Mohammed V, Rabat 
 Avenue Mohammed V (Tunis)

See also
 Avenue Mohammed VI (disambiguation)